Jemal Ovezdurdiyeva (born 1998), is a Turkmenistani chess player. She was awarded the title of Woman FIDE Master in 2018.

Chess Career
She has represented Turkmenistan in a number of Women's Chess Olympiads, including:
 2014, where she was selected, but the team did not compete.
 2016, scoring 5/5/11 on board two.
 2018, scoring 8/10 on board three.

She qualified for the Women's Chess World Cup 2021, and was drawn to play Olga Badelka in the first round, with Badelka winning on a walkover.

References

External links

Jemal Ovezdurdiyeva chess games at 365Chess.com

1998 births
Living people
Turkmenistan chess players
Chess Woman FIDE Masters